Standings and results for Group 1 of the UEFA Euro 1996 qualifying tournament.

Standings

Results

Goalscorers

References

A. Yelagin - History of European Championships 1960-2000 (Terra-Sport, Moscow, 2002) - attendance information

Group 1
1994–95 in Israeli football
1995–96 in Israeli football
1994–95 in Romanian football
1995–96 in Romanian football
Romania at UEFA Euro 1996
1994–95 in French football
qual
1994–95 in Slovak football
1995–96 in Slovak football
1994–95 in Polish football
1995–96 in Polish football
1994–95 in Azerbaijani football
1995–96 in Azerbaijani football